Suely Brito de Miranda, known as Sula Miranda (São Paulo, November 12, 1963), is a Brazilian singer, television presenter and writer. She reached success from the end of 1980s, singing Música sertaneja. She is the sister of singer Gretchen.

Miranda began her musical career in the group "As Mirandas", along with her sisters Yara and Maria Odete (Gretchen) and later became the quartet As Melindrosas with the inclusion of her friend Paula. The first LP "Disco Baby" was a huge success, reaching the mark of 1 million copies sold.

Miranda started her solo career in 1986, the year she released her first album.

References

External links
 

Brazilian gospel singers
1963 births
Sertanejo musicians
Living people